Diederik David van Weel (born 28 September 1973, in Baarn) is a former Dutch field hockey player, who played 61 international matches for the Netherlands, in which he didn't score a single goal. The defender made his debut for the Dutch on 17 August 1998 in a match against Argentina. He played in the Dutch League for HC Bloemendaal and Laren, and was a member of the team that won the gold medal at the 2000 Summer Olympics in Sydney. He stopped playing hockey in 2005.

External links

 Dutch Hockey Federation

1973 births
Living people
Dutch male field hockey players
Male field hockey defenders
Field hockey players at the 2000 Summer Olympics
2002 Men's Hockey World Cup players
Olympic field hockey players of the Netherlands
Olympic gold medalists for the Netherlands
Olympic medalists in field hockey
People from Baarn
Medalists at the 2000 Summer Olympics
HC Bloemendaal players
Sportspeople from Utrecht (province)